Fort McCoy may refer to:

 Fort McCoy, Florida, a community in Marion County
 Fort McCoy, Wisconsin, a military base
 Fort McCoy (film), a 2011 film